The Fatty Knees fibreglass sailing dinghies were designed by Lyle Hess (1912–2002).  Produced in 7’ (2.1m), 8’ (2.4m) and 9’ (2.7m) long models. The 8’ model has a 4’ (1.2m) beam.  Primarily designed as a yacht tender with good rowing and towing characteristics, the boat can be sailed, with enough width in the beam to provide stability. 

The hull has a lapstrake appearance.  The thwarts and dagger-board trunk are fiberglass inserts glassed into the hull and are watertight. It is cat rigged with a Bermuda mainsail. A transom notch allows sculling. Equipped with oarlocks for rowing.  A small outboard motor can be mounted to port. Sailing gear is designed to be stored inside the hull. About 2000 dinghies have been produced.

References

External links

Dinghies
Sailboat types built in the United States
Sailboat type designs by Lyle Hess